Tommaso Iannone (born 16 September 1990) is a retired Italian rugby union player and he played for Zebre and Benetton in the Pro14 and the Italian national team. His position was Wing, although he can also play as a Fly-half.

He began his career with Crociati Parma before he moved to Benetton Treviso in 2011. He made his international test debut in a 28–23 win against Tonga on 10 November 2012.

In May 2013, it was announced that Tommaso Iannone was dropped from the squad and would join Zebre. Iannone returned to Benetton in 2015.

References

1990 births
Living people
Italian rugby union players
Sportspeople from Treviso
Rugby union wings
Rugby union fly-halves
Italy international rugby union players
Benetton Rugby players
Zebre Parma players